The story of a Magian love (Arabic: قصة حب مجوسية) is a novel published in 2013 by Dar Al-Tanweer. It was written by Abd Al-Rahman Al-munif.

Novel summary 
Munif's started writing the novel from the moment of crisis, in the moment he fell in love with Lillian, and he began to explain to us how love fills his heart towards her, in the past he already had fallen in love with three other girls, However, Lillian's let him forget all his previous experiences, and from this point his search journey started to find everything related to her begins, but no avail.

All of his three previous relations with the girls failed one after the other, he continued to search for Lillian, and he was aware that she was married and had two children, However, the love that he was carried in his heart for her did not make him see this reality, Abd Al-Rahman did not lose hope of meeting her until the last letter in his story. And the reason for naming the novel by this name, is that Munif's love for Lillian is like the worship of the Magi in the fire, although it burns them, but they still worship it.

The story of a Magain love is almost not free from cases of anger at everything in the universe, and because of his bad luck and his lack of seeing his beloved, and Lillian's husband, who called him obese, and this is only because of his hatred for him and jealousy for his beloved from him, the love which was one-sided love.

References 

Arabic-language novels
2013 novels